Jake Roberts is an English film editor. He is best known for his works on films Citadel (2012), Starred Up (2013), The Riot Club (2014) and Brooklyn (2015). For Hell or High Water (2016), Roberts was nominated (among several honors) for an Independent Spirit Award and the Academy Award for Best Film Editing at the 89th Academy Awards.

Filmography

As an editor 

 Civil War (TBA)
 Men (2022)
 You Resemble Me (2021)
 Devs (TV Mini-Series, 2020)
 Outlaw King (2018)
 The Hitman's Bodyguard  (2017)
 Trespass Against Us (2016)
 Hell or High Water (2016) 
 Mr. Burberry (Short, 2016) 
 Kanye West: All Day/I Feel Like That (Short, 2015)
 Pressure (2015)
 Brooklyn (2015)
 The Riot Club (2014)
 Starred Up (2013)
 Skins (TV Series, 2013)
 Foxy and Marina (Short, 2013)
 Misfits Misfits (TV Series) (3 episodes, 2012)
 Citadel (2012)
 Tonight You're Mine (2011)
 Perfect Sense (2011)
 Donkeys (2010)
 I Love Luci (Short, 2010)
 The Week We Went to War]] (TV Series documentary) (5 episodes, 2009)
 Personal Affairs (2 episodes, 2009)
 Stacked (TV Movie, 2008)
 Shot in Bombay (Documentary, 2008) 
 Office Tigers (Documentary, 2006)
 Long Way Round (TV Mini-Series documentary) (3 episodes, 2004)
 The Last Great Wilderness (2002)
 Small Moments (Short, 2001)
 Somersault (Short, 2001)

Accolades

See also
List of film director and editor collaborations

References

External links 

1977 births
Living people
English film editors